Karen Hollis is an American professor of psychology and education at Mount Holyoke College in South Hadley Massachusetts.  Hollis's research focusses on an evolutionary approach to learning and cognition in non human animals.  She served as the head of the American Psychological Association's sixth division (behavioural neuroscience and comparative psychology) from 2006 to 2007 and the third division (experimental psychology] from 2010 to 2011.  Hollis was the first woman to head the third division.  She has served on the editorial boards of many journals, including Animal Behaviour, Animal Learning and Behavior and the Journal of Comparative Psychology.

Hollis received a B.A. from Slippery Rock State College (now Slippery Rock University of Pennsylvania) and a Ph.D. from the University of Minnesota.

In 2016 Hollis was honored Comparative Cognition Society for her contributions to the study of animal cognition.

References

External links
Hollis's work discussed in the Telegraph
Ants to the Rescue

21st-century American psychologists
American women psychologists
Animal cognition writers
Experimental psychologists
Mount Holyoke College faculty
Slippery Rock University of Pennsylvania alumni
University of Minnesota alumni
Year of birth missing (living people)
Living people
American women academics
21st-century American women